Fernando Thode is a Uruguayan sailor. He competed in the Finn event at the 1968 Summer Olympics. He also won a bronze medal in the Snipe event at the 1983 Pan American Games.

References

External links
 

Year of birth missing (living people)
Living people
Uruguayan male sailors (sport)
Olympic sailors of Uruguay
Sailors at the 1968 Summer Olympics – Finn
Sportspeople from Montevideo
Pan American Games bronze medalists for Uruguay
Pan American Games medalists in sailing
Sailors at the 1983 Pan American Games
Medalists at the 1983 Pan American Games